The International Rules Series is a senior men's competition played under the laws of international rules football, a hybrid sport combining elements of Gaelic football and Australian rules football. The series is overseen by the two sports' governing bodies, the Gaelic Athletic Association and Australian Football League. This page lists results of each test match in the series. Click on the a series year for a more detailed recording of results.

Results
Though the first Australian Football World Tour took place in 1967, it wasn't until 1984 that the first organised series sanctioned by the two governing bodies occurred. The four series that took place from 1984 to 1990 featured three test matches each, with the winning nation being the one to secure at least two victories. Since 1998 each series has been played over two matches, with the winning nation being the one to score the highest amount on aggregate over the two tests. This excludes the 2014 and 2015 series, which were both one-off matches.

Scores are given in the form [goals] [overs] [behinds] ([points]). A goal equals 6 points, an over 3, and a behind 1. So 2.9.7 (46) means 2 goals, 9 overs and 7 behinds; 2(6) + 9(3) + 7(1) = 12 + 27 + 7 = 46 points in total.
 

|- style=";background:#ccf;font-size: 85%" 
| 
| Series
| Date
| Home Nation
| 
| Away Nation
| 
| Ground
| Crowd
| 
| Series Winner
|
|- style="background:#fff;font-size: 85%;"
| 1
| rowspan="3" style="text-align: center;"|1984
| 21/10
| Ireland
| 4.8.9 (57)
| style="background:#cfc;"| Australia
| style="background:#cfc;"| 2.15.13 (70)
| Páirc Uí Chaoimh
| 8,000
| rowspan="3"|+14
| rowspan="3"!div style="background:Navy; text-align:center;"|
| rowspan="1"!div style="background:Navy; text-align:center;"|
|- style="background:#fff;font-size: 85%;"
| 2
| 28/10 
| style="background:#cfc;"| Ireland
| style="background:#cfc;"| 3.18.8 (80)
| Australia
| 1.18.16 (76)
| rowspan="2"|Croke Park
| 12,500
| 
|- style="background:#fff;font-size: 85%;"
| 3
| 4/11
| Ireland
| 5.11.8 (71)
| style="background:#cfc;"| Australia
| style="background:#cfc;"| 1.18.16 (76)
| 32,318
| rowspan="1"!div style="background:Navy; text-align:center;"|
|- style="background:#fff;font-size: 85%;"
| 4
| rowspan="3" style="text-align: center;"|1986
| 11/10
| style="background:#cfc;"| Australia
| style="background:#cfc;"| 1.14.16 (64)
| Ireland
| 5.5.12 (57)
| WACA Ground
| 25,000
| rowspan="3"|+32
| rowspan="3"!div style="background:Green; text-align:center;"|
| rowspan="1"!div style="background:Navy; text-align:center;"|
|- style="background:#fff;font-size: 85%;"
| 5
| 19/10
| Australia
| 1.10.10 (46)
| style="background:#cfc;"| Ireland
| style="background:#cfc;"| 3.10.14 (62)
| VFL Park
| 10,883
| rowspan="1"!div style="background:Navy; text-align:center;"|
|- style="background:#fff;font-size: 85%;"
| 6
| 24/10
| Australia
| 0.7.11 (32)
| style="background:#cfc;"| Ireland
| style="background:#cfc;"| 4.8.7 (55)
| Football Park
| 10,000
| 
|- style="background:#fff;font-size: 85%;"
| 7
| rowspan="3" style="text-align: center;"|1987
| 18/10
| style="background:#cfc;"| Ireland
| style="background:#cfc;"| 3.7.14 (53)
| Australia
| 1.11.12 (51)
| rowspan="3"|Croke Park
| 15,532
| rowspan="3"|+23
| rowspan="3"!div style="background:Navy; text-align:center;"|
| rowspan="1"!div style="background:Green; text-align:center;"|
|- style="background:#fff;font-size: 85%;" 
| 8
| 1/11
| Ireland
| 3.6.11 (47)
| style="background:#cfc;"| Australia
| style="background:#cfc;"| 3.14.12 (72)
| 15,485
| 
|- style="background:#fff;font-size: 85%;" 
| 9
| 8/11
| Ireland
| 1.13.10 (55)
| style="background:#cfc;"| Australia
| style="background:#cfc;"| 0.14.17 (59)
| 27,023
| rowspan="1"!div style="background:Navy; text-align:center;"|
|- style="background:#fff;font-size: 85%;" 
| 10
| rowspan="3" style="text-align: center;"|1990
| 2/11
| Australia
| 0.10.8 (38)
| style="background:#cfc;"| Ireland
| style="background:#cfc;"| 0.12.11 (47)
| Waverley Park
| 18,332
| rowspan="3"|+24
| rowspan="3"!div style="background:Green; text-align:center;"|
| 
|- style="background:#fff;font-size: 85%;" 
| 11
| 10/11
| Australia
| 0.7.10 (31)
| style="background:#cfc;"| Ireland
| style="background:#cfc;"| 3.9.7 (52)
| Bruce Stadium
| 7,000
| rowspan="1"!div style="background:Green; text-align:center;"|
|- style="background:#fff;font-size: 85%;"
| 12
| 17/11
| style="background:#cfc;"| Australia
| style="background:#cfc;"| 0.13.11 (50)
| Ireland
| 0.12.8 (44)
| WACA Ground
| 7,700
| 
|- style="background:#fff;font-size: 85%;" 
| 13
| rowspan="2" style="text-align: center;"|1998
| 11/10
| Ireland
| 2.13.10 (61)
| style="background:#cfc;"| Australia
| style="background:#cfc;"| 2.13.11 (62)
| rowspan="2"|Croke Park
| 22,900
| rowspan="2"|+24
| rowspan="2"!div style="background:Green; text-align:center;"|
| rowspan="1"!div style="background:Navy; text-align:center;"|
|- style="background:#fff;font-size: 85%;" 
| 14
| 18/10
| style="background:#cfc;"| Ireland
| style="background:#cfc;"| 4.12.7 (67)
| Australia
| 2.10.14 (56)
| 35,221
| 
|- style="background:#fff;font-size: 85%;" 
| 15
| rowspan="2" style="text-align: center;"|1999
| 8/10
| Australia
| 0.16.14 (62)
| style="background:#cfc;"| Ireland
| style="background:#cfc;"| 2.16.10 (70)
| Melbourne Cricket Ground
| 64,326
| rowspan="2"|+8
| rowspan="2"!div style="background:Green; text-align:center;"|
| rowspan="1"!div style="background:Green; text-align:center;"|
|- style="background:#fff;font-size: 85%;" 
| 16
| 15/10
| Australia
| 2.12.4 (52)
| Ireland
| 1.11.13 (52)
| Football Park
| 45,187
| rowspan="1"!div style="background:Green; text-align:center;"|
|- style="background:#fff;font-size: 85%;" 
| 17
| rowspan="2" style="text-align: center;"|2000
| 8/10
| Ireland
| 1.11.8 (47)
| style="background:#cfc;"| Australia
| style="background:#cfc;"| 0.14.13 (55)
| rowspan="2"|Croke Park
| 38,016
| rowspan="2"|+25
| rowspan="2"!div style="background:Navy; text-align:center;"|
| 
|- style="background:#fff;font-size: 85%;" 
| 18
| 15/10
| Ireland
| 1.12.9 (51)
| style="background:#cfc;"| Australia
| style="background:#cfc;"| 2.15.11 (68)
| 57,289
| rowspan="1"!div style="background:Navy; text-align:center;"|
|- style="background:#fff;font-size: 85%;" 
| 19
| rowspan="2" style="text-align: center;"|2001
| 12/10
| Australia
| 1.13.8 (53)
| style="background:#cfc;"| Ireland
| style="background:#cfc;"| 2.13.8 (59)
| Melbourne Cricket Ground
| 48,121
| rowspan="2"|+25
| rowspan="2"!div style="background:Green; text-align:center;"|
| 
|- style="background:#fff;font-size: 85%;" 
| 20
| 19/10
| Australia
| 1.13.7 (52)
| style="background:#cfc;"| Ireland
| style="background:#cfc;"| 2.17.8 (71)
| Football Park
| 31,713
| rowspan="1"!div style="background:Green; text-align:center;"|
|- style="background:#fff;font-size: 85%;" 
| 21
| rowspan="2" style="text-align: center;"|2002
| 13/10
| Ireland
| 1.14.10 (58)
| style="background:#cfc;"| Australia
| style="background:#cfc;"| 2.15.8 (65)
| rowspan="2"|Croke Park
| 44,221
| rowspan="2"|+7
| rowspan="2"!div style="background:Navy; text-align:center;"|
| 
|- style="background:#fff;font-size: 85%;" 
| 22
| 20/10
| Ireland 
| 1.8.12 (42)
| Australia
| 1.11.3 (42)
| 71,544
| 
|- style="background:#fff;font-size: 85%;" 
| 23
| rowspan="2" style="text-align: center;"|2003
| 24/10
| style="background:#cfc;"| Australia
| style="background:#cfc;"| 3.10.8 (56)
| Ireland
| 1.10.10 (46)
| Subiaco Oval
| 41,228 
| rowspan="2"|+7
| rowspan="2"!div style="background:Navy; text-align:center;"|
| rowspan="1"!div style="background:Navy; text-align:center;"|
|- style="background:#fff;font-size: 85%;" 
| 24
| 31/10
| Australia
| 1.10.9 (45)
| style="background:#cfc;"| Ireland
| style="background:#cfc;"| 2.9.9 (48)
| Melbourne Cricket Ground
| 60,235
| 
|- style="background:#fff;font-size: 85%;" 
| 25
| rowspan="2" style="text-align: center;"|2004
| 17/10
| style="background:#cfc;"| Ireland
| style="background:#cfc;"| 3.17.8 (77)
| Australia
| 1.9.8 (41)
| rowspan="2"|Croke Park
| 46,370
| rowspan="2"|+50
| rowspan="2"!div style="background:Green; text-align:center;"|
| rowspan="1"!div style="background:Green; text-align:center;"|
|- style="background:#fff;font-size: 85%;" 
| 26
| 24/10
| style="background:#cfc;"| Ireland
| style="background:#cfc;"| 1.13.10 (55)
| Australia
| 0.13.2 (41)
| 60,515
| rowspan="1"!div style="background:Green; text-align:center;"|
|- style="background:#fff;font-size: 85%;" 
| 27
| rowspan="2" style="text-align: center;"|2005
| 21/10
| style="background:#cfc;"| Australia
| style="background:#cfc;"| 2.27.7 (100)
| Ireland
| 3.11.13 (64)
| Subiaco Oval
| 39,098
| rowspan="2"|+57
| rowspan="2"!div style="background:Navy; text-align:center;"|
| rowspan="1"!div style="background:Green; text-align:center;"|
|- style="background:#fff;font-size: 85%;" 
| 28 
| 28/10
| style="background:#cfc;"| Australia
| style="background:#cfc;"| 0.18.9 (63)
| Ireland
| 0.11.9 (42)
| Telstra Dome
| 45,428
| 
|- style="background:#fff;font-size: 85%;" 
| 29
| rowspan="2" style="text-align: center;"|2006
| 28/10
| style="background:#cfc;"| Ireland
| style="background:#cfc;"| 1.12.6 (48)
| Australia
| 1.9.7 (40)
| Pearse Stadium
| 35,000
| rowspan="2"|+30
| rowspan="2"!div style="background:Navy; text-align:center;"|
| rowspan="1"!div style="background:Green; text-align:center;"|
|- style="background:#fff;font-size: 85%;" 
| 30 
| 5/11
| Ireland
| 0.7.10 (31)
| style="background:#cfc;"| Australia
| style="background:#cfc;"| 3.15.6 (69)
| Croke Park
| 82,127
| 
|- style="background:#fff;font-size: 85%;" 
| 31
| rowspan="2" style="text-align: center;"|2008
| 24/10
| Australia
| 0.12.8 (44)
| style="background:#cfc;"| Ireland
| style="background:#cfc;"| 3.6.9 (45)
| Subiaco Oval
| 35,153
| rowspan="2"|+5
| rowspan="2"!div style="background:Green; text-align:center;"|
| rowspan="1"!div style="background:Green; text-align:center;"|
|- style="background:#fff;font-size: 85%;" 
| 32 
| 31/10
| Australia
| 3.8.11 (53)
| style="background:#cfc;"| Ireland
| style="background:#cfc;"| 4.8.9 (57)
| Melbourne Cricket Ground
| 42,823
| rowspan="1"!div style="background:Green; text-align:center;"|
|- style="background:#fff;font-size: 85%;" 
| 33
| rowspan="2" style="text-align: center;"|2010
| 23/10
| Ireland
| 1.8.10 (40)
| style="background:#cfc;"| Australia
| style="background:#cfc;"| 0.14.5 (47)
| Gaelic Grounds
| 30,117
| rowspan="2"|+10
| rowspan="2"!div style="background:Navy; text-align:center;"|
| rowspan="1"!div style="background:Green; text-align:center;"|
|- style="background:#fff;font-size: 85%;" 
| 34
| 30/10
| Ireland
| 1.11.13 (52)
| style="background:#cfc;"| Australia
| style="background:#cfc;"| 0.14.13 (55)
| Croke Park
| 61,842
| 
|- style="background:#fff;font-size: 85%;" 
| 35
| rowspan="2" style="text-align: center;"|2011
| 28/10
| Australia
| 1.8.6 (36)
| style="background:#cfc;"| Ireland
| style="background:#cfc;"| 4.17.5 (80)
| Etihad Stadium
| 22,921
| rowspan="2"|+65
| rowspan="2"!div style="background:Green; text-align:center;"|
| rowspan="1"!div style="background:Green; text-align:center;"|
|- style="background:#fff;font-size: 85%;" 
| 36 
| 4/11
| Australia
| 0.7.8 (29)
| style="background:#cfc;"| Ireland
| style="background:#cfc;"| 1.13.5 (50)
| Metricon Stadium
| 12,545
| rowspan="1"!div style="background:Green; text-align:center;"|
|- style="background:#fff;font-size: 85%;" 
| 37
| rowspan="2" style="text-align: center;"|2013
| 19/10
| style="background:#cfc;"| Ireland
| style="background:#cfc;"| 2.12.9 (57)
| Australia
| 1.7.8 (35)
| Breffni Park
| 17,657
| rowspan="2"|+101
| rowspan="2"!div style="background:Green; text-align:center;"|
| rowspan="1"!div style="background:Green; text-align:center;"|
|- style="background:#fff;font-size: 85%;" 
| 38
| 26/10
| style="background:#cfc;"| Ireland
| style="background:#cfc;"| 6.22.14 (116)
| Australia
| 2.7.4 (37)
| Croke Park
| 28,525
| rowspan="1"!div style="background:Green; text-align:center;"|
|- style="background:#fff;font-size: 85%;" 
| 39
| rowspan="1" style="text-align: center;"|2014
| 22/11
| style="background:#cfc;"| Australia
| style="background:#cfc;"| 0.17.5 (56)
| Ireland
| 2.9.7 (46)
| Patersons Stadium
| 38,262
| rowspan="1"|+10
| rowspan="1"!div style="background:Navy; text-align:center;"|
| rowspan="1"!div style="background:Green; text-align:center;"|
|- style="background:#fff;font-size: 85%;" 
| 40
| rowspan="1" style="text-align: center;"|2015
| 21/11
| style="background:#cfc;"| Ireland
| style="background:#cfc;"| 3.11.5 (56)
| Australia
| 1.13.7 (52)
| Croke Park
| 38,386
| rowspan="1"|+10
| rowspan="1"!div style="background:Green; text-align:center;"|
| rowspan="1"!div style="background:Green; text-align:center;"|
|- style="background:#fff;font-size: 85%;" 
| 41
| rowspan="2" style="text-align: center;"|2017
| 12/11
| style="background:#cfc;"| Australia
| style="background:#cfc;"| 2.13.12 (63)
| Ireland
| 1.13.8 (53)
| Adelaide Oval
| 25,502
| rowspan="2"|+13
| rowspan="2"!div style="background:Navy; text-align:center;"|
| rowspan="1"!div style="background:Green; text-align:center;"|
|- style="background:#fff;font-size: 85%;" 
| 42 
| 18/11
| style="background:#cfc;"| Australia
| style="background:#cfc;"| 0.15.8 (53)
| Ireland
| 2.10.8 (50)
| Domain Stadium
| 30,116
| rowspan="1"!div style="background:Green; text-align:center;"|

Summary of results

Records
Biggest series win (1998–2017): 101 points, 2013, Ireland 173–72 Australia
Biggest test win (1998–2017): 79 points, second test 2013, Ireland 116–37 Australia
Closest series (1998–2017): 4 points, 2015, Ireland 56–52 Australia (1 test only)
Highest-scoring test (1998–2017): 164 points, first test 2005, Australia 100–64 Ireland
Lowest-scoring test (1998–2017): 84 points, second test 2002, Ireland 42–42 Australia
Highest attendance (1998–2017): 82,127, Croke Park, second test 2006
Highest attendance (1984–1990): 32,318, Croke Park, third test 1984
Lowest attendance (1998–2017): 12,545, Metricon Stadium, second test 2011
Lowest attendance (1984–1990): 7,000, Bruce Stadium, second test 1990
Average attendance (1998–2014): 42,898
Average attendance (1984–1990): 33,648
Record point scorer: Steven McDonnell (Ireland & Armagh), 119 points
Australian clean sweeps: 4 (2000, 2005, 2010, 2017)
Irish clean sweeps: 5 (2001, 2004, 2008, 2011, 2013)

Other series
An under-17 boys series was contested by the nations until it was abandoned in 2006, and a solitary women's series was played in Ireland in 2006.

Under-17
An under-17 boys series is believed to been played yearly since 1996, though results for only these three tours are known.

Irish player of the series: Ray Cullivan (2005) & Kevin Nolan (2006)Australian player of the series: Joel Selwood (2005) & Bryce Gibbs (2006)

Women

See also
 Australia international rules football team
 Ireland international rules football team
 Australia women's international rules football team
 Ireland women's international rules football team

References

Sources
 International Rules at AustralianFootball.com
 Australian Football League (AFL) International Rules history
 Australia v Ireland 1967-2015 results

 
International rules football